Karina Flores, also known as Karina Grigoryan, is a Russian opera singer who has sung leading soprano roles with companies in her native Russia as well as in other European countries. For eight seasons she was a soloist with Helikon Opera in Moscow and has gone on to sing at the Teatro Regio in Turin, the Teatro Filarmonico in Verona, the Teatro San Carlo in Naples, and the Tyrolean State Theatre in Innsbruck, amongst others. She made her American debut in 2018 as the soprano soloist in a performance of the War Requiem at the Kennedy Center conducted by Gianandrea Noseda. On disc Flores appears as Lisa in Israeli Opera's 2012 recording of Pique Dame conducted by Vladimir Jurowski.

Life and career

Flores was born in the Russian city of Shakhty to parents of Armenian descent. She began her musical education at the conservatory in Shakhty and went on to study at the  Rostov State Conservatory from 1999 to 2005. It was there that she made her stage debut in the title role of Madama Butterfly. In 2006 she continued her vocal studies in Moscow under  and from 2008 to 2011 in Rome at the Accademia Nazionale di Santa Cecilia under Renata Scotto. During this time, she placed third in the 2008 Galina Vishnevskaya International Opera Singers Competition, and she continued her professional career singing with Helikon Opera in Moscow and on tour.

Flores was engaged as a soloist with Helikon Opera in 2006 and remained with the company for eight years. Her numerous roles with Helikon included Rosina in The Barber of Seville, Amelia in Un ballo in maschera,  the title roles of Aida and Lady Macbeth of the Mtsensk District, and Stephana in Gordano's rarely performed Siberia. In 2012 she also made her debut with Israeli Opera as Lisa in Tchaikovsky's Pique Dame. The production, conducted by Vladimir Jurowski, was later released on CD and DVD. It was a role she would later reprise at the Heidenheim Opera Festival in 2019.

Between 2014 and 2019, Flores made a number of European house debuts, including Santuzza in Cavalleria rusticana at the Teatro San Carlo in 2014, Desdemona in Otello at the Teatro Filarmonico in Verona in 2018, and Leonora in Il trovatore at the Teatro Regio in Turin in 2018. In later seasons she returned to the theatre as Amelia in Un ballo in maschera (2016) and as Angelica in Suor Angelica (2019). 

Flores made her American debut in 2018 as the soprano soloist in a performance of Britten's War Requiem at the Kennedy Center conducted by Gianandrea Noseda. Her other concert appearances have included the soprano soloist in Brahms's German Requiem at the Teatro Regio in Turin conducted by Pinchas Steinberg in 2018 and the Mozart Requiem performed in Spain's Palma Cathedral in 2019.

Repertory

References

External links
 Karina Flores on Operabase
https://www.karinaflores-belcanto.com/

Russian operatic sopranos

Year of birth missing (living people)
Living people